Hilo Chen (born October 15, 1942 in Yilan, Taiwan) is a Taiwanese-born American painter. He is best known for his photorealistic paintings of the female figure. He lives and works in New York. His work is in major museum collections throughout the world including the Solomon R. Guggenheim Museum and the Taipei Fine Arts Museum.

See also
Taiwanese art

Notes

External links
Hilo Chen's Timeline

1942 births
Living people
American artists of Chinese descent
20th-century American painters
American male painters
21st-century American painters
Painters from New York City
Taiwanese emigrants to the United States
Taiwanese painters
People from Yilan County, Taiwan
20th-century American male artists